Terrain is the vertical and horizontal dimension of land surface.

Terrain may also refer to:
 Terrain (journal), a French academic publication
 Terrain (album), a 1987 studio album by Kids in the Kitchen
 Terrain (Portico Quartet album)
 Terrain (film), a 1994 Australian film
 Terrain.org, online journal

See also
 Chaos terrain, chaotic planetary geology
 John Terraine (1921–2003), British writer and military historian
 Terrain mask, in aviation
 Terrain park, an outdoor area that contains terrain that allows snowboarders and skiers to do tricks
 Terrain rendering, in computer graphics
 Terran (disambiguation)
 Terrane, a geologic term